The Regional Trial Courts  are the highest trial courts in the Philippines. In criminal matters, they have original jurisdiction.

History
It was formerly called as the Court of First Instance since the Spanish era. It continued throughout its colonization under Spanish and Americans. After the independence from the United States, Republic Act No. 296 or Judiciary Act of 1948 was enacted to reinforce its jurisdictional powers of the Court of First Instance. Under its law, it has the power to try civil and criminal cases, as well as appeals from the decisions made by the municipality and city Justice of the Peace courts.

However, there were numerous cases (both civil and criminal) yet to be resolved or being delayed for years due to their nature. In addition, there were special courts made to try specialized cases like criminal, agricultural, and family to decongest cases, which unfortunately ended up complicating the judiciary system. Therefore, the Interim Batasang Pambansa has passed Batas Pambansa Blg. 129, or The Judiciary Reorganization Act of 1980, which reorganized the lower and intermediate courts in the country, which include the change of Court of First Instance to Regional Trial Court.

Jurisdiction
Batas Pambansa Blg. 129, or The Judiciary Reorganization Act of 1980, and Republic Act No. 7691, or An Act Expanding the Jurisdiction of the Metropolitan Trial Courts, Municipal Trial Courts, and Municipal Circuit Trial Courts of 1994, as amended, gave the RTCs the following jurisdiction:

Civil

(1)	In all civil actions in which the subject of the litigation is incapable of pecuniary estimation;

(2)	In all civil actions which involve the title to, or possession of, real property, or any interest therein, where the assessed value of the property involved exceeds twenty thousand pesos (₱20,000.00) or, for civil actions in Metro Manila, where such value exceeds fifty thousand pesos (₱50,000.00) except actions for forcible entry into and unlawful detainer of lands or buildings, original jurisdiction over which is conferred upon the Metropolitan Trial Courts, Municipal Trial Courts, and Municipal Circuit Trial Courts.

(3)	In all actions in admiralty and maritime jurisdiction where the demand or claim exceeds one hundred thousand pesos (₱100,000.00) or, in Metro Manila, where such demand or claim exceeds two hundred thousand pesos (₱200,000.00).

(4)	In all matters of probate, both testate and intestate where the gross value of the estate exceeds one hundred thousand pesos (₱100,000.00) or, in probate matters in Metro Manila, where such gross value exceeds two hundred thousand pesos (₱200,000.00).

(5)	In all actions involving the contract of marriage and marital relations.

(6)	In all cases not within the exclusive jurisdiction of any court, tribunal, person or body exercising jurisdiction of any court, tribunal, person or body exercising judicial or quasi-judicial functions.

(7)	In all civil actions and special proceedings falling within the exclusive original jurisdiction of a Juvenile and Domestic Relations Court and of the Court of Agrarian Relations as now provided by law.

(8)	In all other cases in which the demand, exclusive of interest, damages of whatever kind, attorney's fees, litigation expenses, and costs or the value of the property in controversy exceeds one hundred thousand pesos (₱100,000.00) or, in such other cases in Metro Manila, where the demand exclusive of the abovementioned items exceeds two hundred thousand pesos (₱200,000.00).

Criminal
Regional Trial Courts shall exercise exclusive original jurisdiction in all criminal cases not within the exclusive jurisdiction of any court, tribunal or body, except those now falling under the exclusive and concurrent jurisdiction of the Sandiganbayan which shall hereafter be exclusively taken cognizance of by the latter. RTC Criminal Courts typically try cases of serious crimes like murder and robbery, as opposed to petty crimes, which reduce the burden of court cases.

Original and special jurisdiction
Regional Trial Courts shall exercise original jurisdiction:

(1) In the issuance of writs of certiorari, prohibition, mandamus, quo warranto, habeas corpus and injunction which may be enforced in any part of their respective regions.

(2) In actions affecting ambassadors and other public ministers and consuls.

The Supreme Court may designate certain branches of the Regional Trial Courts to handle exclusively criminal cases, juvenile and domestic relations cases, agrarian cases, urban land reform cases which do not fall under the jurisdiction of quasi-judicial bodies and agencies, and/or such other special cases as the Supreme Court may determine in the interest of a speedy and efficient administration of justice.

Appeals from lower courts
Regional Trial Courts shall exercise appellate jurisdiction over all cases decided by Metropolitan Trial Courts, Municipal Trial Courts, and Municipal Circuit Trial Courts in their respective territorial jurisdictions. Such cases shall be decided on the basis of the entire record of the proceedings had in the court of origin and such memoranda and/or briefs as may be submitted by the parties or required by the Regional Trial Courts. The decision of the Regional Trial Courts in such cases shall be appealable by petition for review to the Court of Appeals which may give it due course only when the petition shows prima facie that the lower court has committed an error of fact or law that will warrant a reversal or modification of the decision or judgment sought to be reviewed.

List
Pursuant to Batas Pambansa Blg. 129 or Judicial Reorganization Act of 1980, each province or city (in case of Metro Manila cities and other Philippine cities, chartered by law) should have a Regional Trial Court (RTC) branch. Congress can create additional RTC branches, when necessary by passing a law.

Summary

Luzon

National Capital Judicial Region

First Judicial Region

Second Judicial Region

Third Judicial Region

Fourth Judicial Region

Fifth Judicial Region

Visayas

Sixth Judicial Region

Seventh Judicial Region

Eighth Judicial Region

Mindanao

Ninth Judicial Region

Tenth Judicial Region

Eleventh Judicial Region

Twelfth Judicial Region

References

Courts in the Philippines
Judicial districts
Electoral courts
Family courts
Courts and tribunals established in 1980